"Excuses" is a song by British DJ Mentis featuring vocals from British singer Kate Wild. It was released on 27 April 2021 by Sinister Sounds and Columbia Records. The song entered the UK Singles Chart at number 49 and at number 18 on the UK Dance Chart.

The song received radio support on Capital Dance and BBC Radio 1.

Music video
A  music video for "Excuses" was released onto Mentis' YouTube channel on 23 July 2021 at a total length of two minutes and fifty-two seconds long.

Track listing

Charts

References

2021 singles
2021 songs
Deep house songs
English house music songs